Pilgrim, Texas is located in Gonzales County, Texas and has a population of approximately sixty. Pilgrim is situated on land granted to Thomas J. Pilgrim by Stephen F. Austin.  Pilgrim, TX is located near a salt flat, and was a notable hideout for John Wesley Hardin in the 1870s.   A map shows Pilgrim is located on Farm to Market Road 1116.

In 1838, Thomas J. Pilgrim received a Republic of Texas land grant in Gonzales County, Texas.  A lake and a settlement on this land were called "Pilgrim." In addition, there were three schools that were part of the Pilgrim Creek School District in the 1880s: 1) Burnett School (established in 1875 and named from another family which had come to the area); Salt Creek School (established in 1878, named for the salt flats in the area); and Lake Grove, (a school then only for blacks established in 1883).  The Pilgrim Presbyterian Church and the Pilgrim Cemetery were also named for Thomas J. Pilgrim.   A Recorded Texas Historic Landmark was placed on the road attesting to the history of Pilgrim.

References

Unincorporated communities in Gonzales County, Texas
Unincorporated communities in Texas